The 2019-20 Ferris State Bulldogs men's ice hockey season was the 45th season of play for the program and the 7th in the WCHA conference. The Bulldogs represented Ferris State University and were coached by Bob Daniels, in his 28th season.

Roster

As of September 12, 2019.

Standings

Schedule and Results

|-
!colspan=12 style=";" | Exhibition

|-
!colspan=12 style=";" | Regular Season

|-
!colspan=12 style=";" |

Scoring Statistics

Goaltending statistics

Rankings

References

Ferris State Bulldogs men's ice hockey seasons
Ferris State Bulldogs
Ferris State Bulldogs
Ferris State Bulldogs
Ferris State Bulldogs